Park Ji-ah is a South Korean actress. She is known for her roles in dramas such as Link: Eat, Love, Kill, Our Blues and Once Upon a Small Town.

Biography and career 
Park Ji-ah started her career in 1998 in theatre plays. She has performed in stage plays and musicals such as Blood and Seed, Daughters of Igalia, Elephant Song, Mokship, and Build Simcheongjeon. In 2021, she signed with Jannabi Entertainment and worked in her first drama Beyond Evil. The following year she had a supporting role in drama Our Blues, portraying the role of Hye-ja, a woman who takes care of her autistic granddaughter. The role was very well-received. Park Ji-ah said that she learned the Jeju dialect used in the role of a local haenyeo, and that many asked her if she was from Jeju. Later, she played the role of Park Seon-hwa in Link: Eat, Love, Kill.

Filmography

Television series

Theatre

Awards and nominations

References

External links 
 

20th-century South Korean actresses
1977 births
Living people
21st-century South Korean actresses
South Korean television actresses
South Korean film actresses